Montreat Conference Center (also known as the Mountain Retreat Association) located in Montreat, North Carolina, United States, is a conference center serving the Presbyterian Church (U.S.A.). The word 'Montreat' is a contraction of the words 'Mountain Retreat'.

Geography
Montreat Conference Center is located just east of Asheville, North Carolina and in close proximity to Black Mountain, North Carolina.

History
 1897 – A group of ecumenical church leaders, led by United Church of Christ minister John Collins, formed the Mountain Retreat Association (MRA). Its purpose was to establish an interdenominational resort and retreat center.
 1905 - J.R. Howerton and the Synod of North Carolina purchased  of the valley to be owned by the Mountain Retreat Association.
 1907 - The Mountain Retreat Association holds the first Presbyterian conference.
 1922 - Construction completed on Anderson Auditorium, a large meeting space able to seat 1,500 people.
 1924 - A concrete dam was constructed (to replace an old wooden one) with funds donated by Susan Graham and her son, Allen. The resulting Lake Susan, a prominent feature in Montreat, was named in her honor.
 1924 - Construction of the Assembly Inn was completed.
 1926 - The Presbyterian Church in the United States opens the Historic Foundation of the Presbyterian and Reformed Churches at Montreat.
 1933 - Montreat Normal School became first Montreat Junior College and then Montreat-Anderson College.
 1967 - The Town of Montreat was incorporated.
 1974 - The Mountain Retreat Association and Montreat-Anderson College became two separate organizations. Montreat-Anderson College then became Montreat College.
 1983 - The Mountain Retreat Association became known as Montreat Conference Center when the United Presbyterian Church in the United States of America reunited with the Presbyterian Church (US) to become the Presbyterian Church, USA.
 2004 -  of Montreat was placed under a conservation easement to protect the valley from development.
 2006 - The Presbyterian Historical Society’s office at Montreat is closed and the collection moved to other repositories.

References

External links
 
 Presbyterian Heritage Center located in Montreat.
 Official website of Montreat, NC

Presbyterian Church (USA)
Religious organizations established in 1897
Organizations based in North Carolina